The attack on Pearl Harbor was a surprise military strike by the Imperial Japanese Navy Air Service upon the United States against the naval base at Pearl Harbor in Honolulu, Territory of Hawaii, just before 8:00a.m. (local time) on Sunday, December 7, 1941. The United States was a neutral country at the time; the attack led to its formal entry into World War II the next day. The Japanese military leadership referred to the attack as the Hawaii Operation and Operation AI, and as Operation Z during its planning.

The attack was preceded by months of negotiations between the U.S. and Japan over the future of the Pacific. Japanese demands included that the U.S. end its sanctions against Japan, cease aiding China in the Second Sino-Japanese war, and allow Japan to access the resources of the Dutch East Indies. Anticipating a negative response from the US, Japan sent out its naval attack groups in November 1941 just prior to receiving the Hull note—the U.S. demand that Japan withdraw from China and Indochina.

Japan intended the attack as a preventive action. Its aim was to prevent the United States Pacific Fleet from interfering with its planned military actions in Southeast Asia against overseas territories of the United Kingdom, the Netherlands, and those of the United States. Over the course of seven hours there were coordinated Japanese attacks on the U.S.-held Philippines, Guam, and Wake Island and on the British Empire in Malaya, Singapore, and Hong Kong.

The attack commenced at 7:48a.m. Hawaiian Time (6:18p.m. GMT). The base was attacked by 353 Imperial Japanese aircraft (including fighters, level and dive bombers, and torpedo bombers) in two waves, launched from six aircraft carriers. Of the eight U.S. Navy battleships present, all were damaged, with four sunk. All but  were later raised, and six were returned to service and went on to fight in the war. The Japanese also sank or damaged three cruisers, three destroyers, an anti-aircraft training ship, and one minelayer. More than 180 US aircraft were destroyed. 2,403 Americans were killed and 1,178 others were wounded. Important base installations such as the power station, dry dock, shipyard, maintenance, and fuel and torpedo storage facilities, as well as the submarine piers and headquarters building (also home of the intelligence section) were not attacked. Japanese losses were light: 29 aircraft and five midget submarines lost, and 64 servicemen killed. Kazuo Sakamaki, the commanding officer of one of the submarines, was captured.

Japan announced declarations of war on the United States and the British Empire later that day (December 8 in Tokyo), but the declarations were not delivered until the following day. The British government declared war on Japan immediately after learning that their territory had also been attacked, while the following day (December 8) the United States Congress declared war on Japan. On December 11, though they had no formal obligation to do so under the Tripartite Pact with Japan, Germany and Italy each declared war on the U.S., which responded with a declaration of war against Germany and Italy. There were numerous historical precedents for the unannounced military action by Japan, but the lack of any formal warning (required by part III of the Hague Convention of 1907), particularly while negotiations were still apparently ongoing, led President Franklin D. Roosevelt to proclaim December 7, 1941, "a date which will live in infamy". Because the attack happened without a declaration of war and without explicit warning, the attack on Pearl Harbor was later judged in the Tokyo Trials to be a war crime.

Background

Diplomacy
War between Japan and the United States had been a possibility that each nation had been aware of, and planned for, since the 1920s. Japan had been wary of American territorial and military expansion in the Pacific and Asia since the late 1890s, followed by the annexation of islands, such as Hawaii and the Philippines, which they felt were close to or within their sphere of influence.

Although Japan had begun to take a hostile policy against the United States after the rejection of the Racial Equality Proposal, the relationship between the two countries was cordial enough that they remained trading partners. Tensions did not seriously grow until Japan's invasion of Manchuria in 1931. Over the next decade, Japan expanded into China, leading to the Second Sino-Japanese War in 1937. Japan spent considerable effort trying to isolate China and endeavored to secure enough independent resources to attain victory on the mainland. The "Southern Operation" was designed to assist these efforts.

Starting in December 1937, events such as the Japanese attack on USS Panay, the Allison incident, and the Nanking Massacre swung Western public opinion sharply against Japan. The US unsuccessfully proposed a joint action with the British to blockade Japan. In 1938, following an appeal by President Roosevelt, US companies stopped providing Japan with implements of war.

In 1940 Japan invaded French Indochina, attempting to stymie the flow of supplies reaching China. The United States halted shipments of airplanes, parts, machine tools, and aviation gasoline to Japan, which the latter perceived as an unfriendly act. The United States did not stop oil exports, however, partly because of the prevailing sentiment in Washington that given Japanese dependence on American oil, such an action was likely to be considered an extreme provocation.

In mid-1940 President Franklin D. Roosevelt moved the Pacific Fleet from San Diego to Hawaii. He also ordered a military buildup in the Philippines, taking both actions in the hope of discouraging Japanese aggression in the Far East. Because the Japanese high command was (mistakenly) certain any attack on the United Kingdom's Southeast Asian colonies, including Singapore, would bring the US into the war, a devastating preventive strike appeared to be the only way to prevent American naval interference. An invasion of the Philippines was also considered necessary by Japanese war planners. The US War Plan Orange had envisioned defending the Philippines with an elite force of 40,000 men; this option was never implemented due to opposition from Douglas MacArthur, who felt he would need a force ten times that size. By 1941, U.S. planners expected to abandon the Philippines at the outbreak of war. Late that year, Admiral Thomas C. Hart, commander of the Asiatic Fleet, was given orders to that effect.

The U.S. finally ceased oil exports to Japan in July 1941, following the seizure of French Indochina after the Fall of France, in part because of new American restrictions on domestic oil consumption. Because of this decision, Japan proceeded with plans to take the oil-rich Dutch East Indies. On August 17, Roosevelt warned Japan that America was prepared to take opposing steps if "neighboring countries" were attacked. The Japanese were faced with a dilemma: either withdraw from China and lose face or seize new sources of raw materials in the resource-rich European colonies of Southeast Asia.

Japan and the U.S. engaged in negotiations during 1941, attempting to improve relations. In the course of these negotiations, Japan offered to withdraw from most of China and Indochina after making peace with the Nationalist government. It also proposed to adopt an independent interpretation of the Tripartite Pact and to refrain from trade discrimination, provided all other nations reciprocated. Washington rejected these proposals. Japanese Prime Minister Konoye then offered to meet with Roosevelt, but Roosevelt insisted on reaching an agreement before any meeting. The US ambassador to Japan repeatedly urged Roosevelt to accept the meeting, warning that it was the only way to preserve the conciliatory Konoye government and peace in the Pacific. However, his recommendation was not acted upon. The Konoye government collapsed the following month when the Japanese military rejected a withdrawal of all troops from China.

Japan's final proposal, delivered on November 20, offered to withdraw from southern Indochina and to refrain from attacks in Southeast Asia, so long as the United States, United Kingdom, and Netherlands supplied  of aviation fuel, lifted their sanctions against Japan, and ceased aid to China. The American counter-proposal of November 26 (November 27 in Japan), the Hull note, required Japan completely evacuate China without conditions and conclude non-aggression pacts with Pacific powers. On November 26 in Japan, the day before the note's delivery, the Japanese task force left port for Pearl Harbor.

The Japanese intended the attack as a preventive action to keep the United States Pacific Fleet from interfering with its planned military actions in Southeast Asia against overseas territories of the United Kingdom, the Netherlands, and the United States. Over the course of seven hours there were coordinated Japanese attacks on the US-held Philippines, Guam, and Wake Island and on the British Empire in Malaya, Singapore, and Hong Kong. Additionally, from the Japanese viewpoint, it was seen as a preemptive strike "before the oil gauge ran empty."

Military planning
Preliminary planning for an attack on Pearl Harbor to protect the move into the "Southern Resource Area" (the Japanese term for the Dutch East Indies and Southeast Asia generally) had begun very early in 1941 under the auspices of Admiral Isoroku Yamamoto, then commanding Japan's Combined Fleet. He won assent to formal planning and training for an attack from the Imperial Japanese Navy General Staff only after much contention with Naval Headquarters, including a threat to resign his command. Full-scale planning was underway by early spring 1941, primarily by Rear Admiral Ryūnosuke Kusaka, with assistance from Captain Minoru Genda and Yamamoto's Deputy Chief of Staff, Captain Kameto Kuroshima. The planners studied the 1940 British air attack on the Italian fleet at Taranto intensively.

Over the next several months, pilots were trained, equipment was adapted, and intelligence was collected. Despite these preparations, Emperor Hirohito did not approve the attack plan until November 5, after the third of four Imperial Conferences called to consider the matter. Final authorization was not given by the emperor until December 1, after a majority of Japanese leaders advised him the "Hull Note" would "destroy the fruits of the China incident, endanger Manchukuo and undermine Japanese control of Korea".

By late 1941, many observers believed that hostilities between the US and Japan were imminent. A Gallup poll just before the attack on Pearl Harbor found that 52% of Americans expected war with Japan, 27% did not, and 21% had no opinion. While US Pacific bases and facilities had been placed on alert on many occasions, US officials doubted Pearl Harbor would be the first target; instead, they expected the Philippines would be attacked first. This presumption was due to the threat that the air bases throughout the country and the naval base at Manila posed to sea lanes, as well as to the shipment of supplies to Japan from territory to the south. They also incorrectly believed that Japan was not capable of mounting more than one major naval operation at a time.

Objectives
The Japanese attack had several major aims. First, it intended to destroy important American fleet units, thereby preventing the Pacific Fleet from interfering with the Japanese conquest of the Dutch East Indies and Malaya and enabling Japan to conquer Southeast Asia without interference. Second, it was hoped to buy time for Japan to consolidate its position and increase its naval strength before shipbuilding authorized by the 1940 Vinson-Walsh Act erased any chance of victory. Third, to deliver a blow to America's ability to mobilize its forces in the Pacific, battleships were chosen as the main targets, since they were the prestige ships of any navy at the time. Finally, it was hoped that the attack would undermine American morale such that the U.S. government would drop its demands contrary to Japanese interests and would seek a compromise peace with Japan.

Striking the Pacific Fleet at anchor in Pearl Harbor carried two distinct disadvantages: the targeted ships would be in very shallow water, so it would be relatively easy to salvage and possibly repair them, and most of the crews would survive the attack since many would be on shore leave or would be rescued from the harbor. A further important disadvantage was the absence from Pearl Harbor of all three of the U.S. Pacific Fleet's aircraft carriers (and ). Imperial Japanese Navy (IJN) top command was attached to Admiral Mahan's "decisive battle" doctrine, especially that of destroying the maximum number of battleships. Despite these concerns, Yamamoto decided to press ahead.

Japanese confidence in their ability to win a short war also meant other targets in the harbor, especially the navy yard, oil tank farms, and submarine base, were ignored since by their thinking the war would be over before the influence of these facilities would be felt.

Approach and attack

On November 26, 1941, a Japanese task force (the Striking Force) of six aircraft carriers, and departed Hittokapu Bay on Kasatka (now Iterup) Island in the Kuril Islands, en route to a position northwest of Hawaii, intending to launch its 408 aircraft to attack Pearl Harbor: 360 for the two attack waves and 48 on defensive combat air patrol (CAP), including nine fighters from the first wave.

The first wave was to be the primary attack, while the second wave was to attack carriers as its first objective and cruisers as its second, with battleships as the third target. The first wave carried most of the weapons to attack capital ships, mainly specially adapted Type 91 aerial torpedoes which were designed with an anti-roll mechanism and a rudder extension that let them operate in shallow water. The aircrews were ordered to select the highest value targets (battleships and aircraft carriers) or, if these were not present, any other high-value ships (cruisers and destroyers). First-wave dive bombers were to attack ground targets. Fighters were ordered to strafe and destroy as many parked aircraft as possible to ensure they did not get into the air to intercept the bombers, especially in the first wave. When the fighters' fuel got low they were to refuel at the aircraft carriers and return to combat. Fighters were to serve CAP duties where needed, especially over US airfields.

Reconnaissance aircraft flights risked alerting the US, and were not necessary. US fleet composition and preparedness information in Pearl Harbor were already known due to the reports of the Japanese spy Takeo Yoshikawa. A report of the absence of the U.S. fleet in Lahaina anchorage off Maui was received from the Tone's floatplane and fleet submarine . Another four scout planes patrolled the area between the Japanese carrier force (the Kidō Butai) and Niihau, to detect any counterattack.

Submarines
The five I-boats left Kure Naval District on November 25, 1941. On December 6, they came to within  of the mouth of Pearl Harbor and launched their midget subs at about 01:00 local time on December 7. At 03:42 Hawaiian Time, the minesweeper  spotted a midget submarine periscope southwest of the Pearl Harbor entrance buoy and alerted the destroyer . The midget may have entered Pearl Harbor. However, Ward sank another midget submarine at 06:37 in the first American shots in the Pacific Theater. A midget submarine on the north side of Ford Island missed the seaplane tender  with her first torpedo and missed the attacking destroyer  with her other one before being sunk by Monaghan at 08:43.

A third midget submarine, Ha-19, grounded twice, once outside the harbor entrance and again on the east side of Oahu, where it was captured on December 8. Ensign Kazuo Sakamaki swam ashore and was captured by Hawaii National Guard Corporal David Akui, becoming the first Japanese prisoner of war. A fourth had been damaged by a depth charge attack and was abandoned by its crew before it could fire its torpedoes. It was found outside the harbor in 1960. Japanese forces received a radio message from a midget submarine at 00:41 on December 8 claiming damage to one or more large warships inside Pearl Harbor.

In 1992, 2000, and 2001 Hawaii Undersea Research Laboratory's submersibles found the wreck of the fifth midget submarine lying in three parts outside Pearl Harbor. The wreck was in the debris field where much surplus U.S. equipment was dumped after the war, including vehicles and landing craft. Both of its torpedoes were missing. This correlates with reports of two torpedoes fired at the light cruiser  at 10:04 at the entrance of Pearl Harbor, and a possible torpedo fired at destroyer  at 08:21.

Japanese declaration of war

The attack took place before any formal declaration of war was made by Japan, but this was not Admiral Yamamoto's intention. He originally stipulated that the attack should not commence until thirty minutes after Japan had informed the United States that peace negotiations were at an end. However, the attack began before the notice could be delivered. Tokyo transmitted the 5000-word notification (commonly called the "14-Part Message") in two blocks to the Japanese Embassy in Washington. Transcribing the message took too long for the Japanese ambassador to deliver it at 1 pm Washington time, as ordered; in the event, it was not presented until more than an hour after the attack began. (In fact, US code breakers had already deciphered and translated most of the message hours before he was scheduled to deliver it.) The final part is sometimes described as a declaration of war. While it was viewed by a number of senior U.S government and military officials as a very strong indicator negotiations were likely to be terminated and that war might break out at any moment, it neither declared war nor severed diplomatic relations. A declaration of war was printed on the front page of Japan's newspapers in the evening edition of December 8 (late December 7 in the US), but not delivered to the US government until the day after the attack.

For decades, conventional wisdom held that Japan attacked without first formally breaking diplomatic relations only because of accidents and bumbling that delayed the delivery of a document hinting at war to Washington. In 1999, however, Takeo Iguchi, a professor of law and international relations at International Christian University in Tokyo, discovered documents that pointed to a vigorous debate inside the government over how, and indeed whether, to notify Washington of Japan's intention to break off negotiations and start a war, including a December 7 entry in the war diary saying, "[O]ur deceptive diplomacy is steadily proceeding toward success." Of this, Iguchi said, "The diary shows that the army and navy did not want to give any proper declaration of war, or indeed prior notice even of the termination of negotiations... and they clearly prevailed."

In any event, even if the Japanese had decoded and delivered the 14-Part Message before the beginning of the attack, it would not have constituted either a formal break of diplomatic relations or a declaration of war. The final two paragraphs of the message read:

U.S. Naval intelligence officers were alarmed by the unusual timing for delivering the message – 1 pm on a Sunday, which was 7:30 am in Hawaii – and attempted to alert Pearl Harbor. But due to communication problems the warning was not delivered before the attack.

First wave composition
The first attack wave of 183 planes was launched north of Oahu, led by Commander Mitsuo Fuchida. Six planes failed to launch due to technical difficulties. The first attack included three groups of planes:

 1st Group (targets: battleships and aircraft carriers)
 49 Nakajima B5N Kate bombers armed with 800kg (1760lb) armor-piercing bombs, organized in four sections (one failed to launch)
 40 B5N bombers armed with Type 91 torpedoes, also in four sections
 2nd Group – (targets: Ford Island and Wheeler Field)
 51 Aichi D3A Val dive bombers armed with  general-purpose bombs (3 failed to launch)
 3rd Group – (targets: aircraft at Ford Island, Hickam Field, Wheeler Field, Barber's Point, Kaneohe)
 43 Mitsubishi A6M "Zero" fighters for air control and strafing (2 failed to launch)

As the first wave approached Oahu, it was detected by the U.S. Army SCR-270 radar at Opana Point near the island's northern tip. This post had been in training mode for months, but was not yet operational. The operators, Privates George Elliot Jr. and Joseph Lockard, reported a target to Private Joseph P. McDonald, a private stationed at Fort Shafter's Intercept Center near Pearl Harbor. But Lieutenant Kermit A. Tyler, a newly assigned officer at the thinly manned Intercept Center, presumed it was the scheduled arrival of six B-17 bombers from California. The Japanese planes were approaching from a direction very close (only a few degrees difference) to the bombers, and while the operators had never seen a formation as large on radar, they neglected to tell Tyler of its size. Tyler, for security reasons, could not tell the operators of the six B-17s that were due (even though it was widely known).

As the first wave of planes approached Oahu, they encountered and shot down several U.S. aircraft. At least one of these radioed a somewhat incoherent warning. Other warnings from ships off the harbor entrance were still being processed or awaiting confirmation when the Japanese air assault began at 7:48a.m. Hawaiian Time (3:18a.m. December 8 Japanese Standard Time, as kept by ships of the Kido Butai), with the attack on Kaneohe. A total of 353 Japanese planes reached Oahu in two waves. Slow, vulnerable torpedo bombers led the first wave, exploiting the first moments of surprise to attack the most important ships present (the battleships), while dive bombers attacked U.S. air bases across Oahu, starting with Hickam Field, the largest, and Wheeler Field, the main U.S. Army Air Forces fighter base. The 171 planes in the second wave attacked the Army Air Forces' Bellows Field near Kaneohe on the windward side of the island and Ford Island. The only aerial opposition came from a handful of P-36 Hawks, P-40 Warhawks, and some SBD Dauntless dive bombers from the carrier .

In the first-wave attack, about eight of the forty-nine 800kg (1760lb) armor-piercing bombs dropped hit their intended battleship targets. At least two of those bombs broke up on impact, another detonated before penetrating an unarmored deck, and one was a dud. Thirteen of the forty torpedoes hit battleships, and four torpedoes hit other ships. Men aboard US ships awoke to the sounds of alarms, bombs exploding, and gunfire, prompting bleary-eyed men to dress as they ran to General Quarters stations. (The famous message, "Air raid Pearl Harbor. This is not drill.", was sent from the headquarters of Patrol Wing Two, the first senior Hawaiian command to respond.) The defenders were very unprepared. Ammunition lockers were locked, aircraft parked wingtip to wingtip in the open to prevent sabotage, guns unmanned (none of the Navy's 5"/38s, only a quarter of its machine guns, and only four of 31 Army batteries got in action). Despite this low alert status, many American military personnel responded effectively during the attack. Ensign Joseph Taussig Jr., aboard , commanded the ship's antiaircraft guns and was severely wounded but continued to be on post. Lieutenant Commander F. J. Thomas commanded Nevada in the captain's absence and got her underway until the ship was grounded at 9:10a.m. One of the destroyers, got underway with only four officers aboard, all ensigns, none with more than a year's sea duty; she operated at sea for 36 hours before her commanding officer managed to get back aboard. Captain Mervyn Bennion, commanding , led his men until he was cut down by fragments from a bomb which hit , moored alongside.

Second wave composition
The second planned wave consisted of 171 planes: 54 B5Ns, 81 D3As, and 36 A6Ms, commanded by Lieutenant-Commander Shigekazu Shimazaki. Four planes failed to launch because of technical difficulties. This wave and its targets also comprised three groups of planes:
 27 B5Ns – aircraft and hangars on Kaneohe, Ford Island, and Barbers Point
 27 B5Ns – hangars and aircraft on Hickam Field
 2nd Group (targets: aircraft carriers and cruisers)
 78 D3As armed with  general-purpose bombs, in four sections (3 aborted)
 3rd Group – (targets: aircraft at Ford Island, Hickam Field, Wheeler Field, Barber's Point, Kaneohe)
 35 A6Ms for defense and strafing (1 aborted)
The second wave was divided into three groups. One was tasked to attack Kāneohe, the rest Pearl Harbor proper. The separate sections arrived at the attack point almost simultaneously from several directions.

American casualties and damage

Ninety minutes after it began, the attack was over. 2,008 sailors were killed and 710 others wounded; 218 soldiers and airmen (who were part of the Army prior to the independent United States Air Force in 1947) were killed and 364 wounded; 109 Marines were killed and 69 wounded; and 68 civilians were killed and 35 wounded. In total, 2,403 Americans were killed, and 1,143 were wounded. Eighteen ships were sunk or run aground, including five battleships. All of the Americans killed or wounded during the attack were legally non-combatants, given that there was no state of war when the attack occurred.

Of the American fatalities, nearly half were due to the explosion of 's forward magazine after it was hit by a modified  shell. Author Craig Nelson wrote that the vast majority of the U.S. sailors killed at Pearl Harbor were junior enlisted personnel. "The officers of the Navy all lived in houses and the junior people were the ones on the boats, so pretty much all of the people who died in the direct line of the attack were very junior people", Nelson said. "So everyone is about 17 or 18 whose story is told there."

Among the notable civilian casualties were nine Honolulu Fire Department (HFD) firefighters who responded to Hickam Field during the bombing in Honolulu, becoming the only fire department members on American soil to be attacked by a foreign power in history. Fireman Harry Tuck Lee Pang of Engine6 was killed near the hangars by machine-gun fire from a Japanese plane. Captains Thomas Macy and John Carreira of Engine4 and Engine1 respectively died while battling flames inside the hangar after a Japanese bomb crashed through the roof. An additional six firefighters were wounded from Japanese shrapnel. The wounded later received Purple Hearts (originally reserved for service members wounded by enemy action while partaking in armed conflicts) for their peacetime actions that day on June 13, 1944; the three firefighters killed did not receive theirs until December 7, 1984, at the 43rd anniversary of the attack. This made the nine men the only non-military firefighters to receive such an award in US history.

Already damaged by a torpedo and on fire amidships, Nevada attempted to exit the harbor. She was targeted by many Japanese bombers as she got under way and sustained more hits from  bombs, which started further fires. She was deliberately beached to avoid blocking the harbor entrance.  was hit by two bombs and two torpedoes. The crew might have kept her afloat, but were ordered to abandon ship just as they were raising power for the pumps. Burning oil from Arizona and  drifted down on her and probably made the situation look worse than it was. The disarmed target ship  was holed twice by torpedoes. West Virginia was hit by seven torpedoes, the seventh tearing away her rudder.  was hit by four torpedoes, the last two above her belt armor, which caused her to capsize.  was hit by two of the converted 16" shells, but neither caused serious damage.

Although the Japanese concentrated on battleships (the largest vessels present), they did not ignore other targets. The light cruiser  was torpedoed, and the concussion from the blast capsized the neighboring minelayer . The leaking fuel caught fire; flooding the dry dock in an effort to fight fire made the burning oil rise, and both were burned out. Cassin slipped from her keel blocks and rolled against Downes. The light cruiser  was holed by a torpedo. The light cruiser  was damaged but remained in service. The repair vessel , moored alongside Arizona, was heavily damaged and beached. The seaplane tender Curtiss was also damaged. The destroyer  was badly damaged when two bombs penetrated her forward magazine.

Of the 402 American aircraft in Hawaii, 188 were destroyed and 159 damaged, 155 of them on the ground. Almost none were actually ready to take off to defend the base. Eight Army Air Forces pilots managed to get airborne during the attack, and six were credited with downing at least one Japanese aircraft during the attack: 1st Lieutenant Lewis M. Sanders, 2nd Lieutenant Philip M. Rasmussen, 2nd Lieutenant Kenneth M. Taylor, 2nd Lieutenant George S. Welch, 2nd Lieutenant Harry W. Brown, and 2nd Lieutenant Gordon H. Sterling Jr. Of 33 PBYs in Hawaii, 30 were destroyed and three on patrol at the time of the attack returned undamaged.

At the time of the attack, nine civilian aircraft were flying in the vicinity of Pearl Harbor. Of these, three were shot down.

Japanese losses
Fifty-five Japanese airmen and nine submariners were killed in the attack, and one, Kazuo Sakamaki, was captured. Of Japan's 414 available planes, 350 took part in the raid in which twenty-nine were lost; nine in the first wave (three fighters, one dive bomber, and five torpedo bombers) and twenty in the second wave (six fighters and fourteen dive bombers) with another 74 damaged by antiaircraft fire from the ground.

Possible third wave
According to some accounts, several Japanese junior officers including Fuchida and Genda urged Nagumo to carry out a third strike in order to sink more of the Pearl Harbor's remaining warships, and damage the base's maintenance shops, drydock facilities, and oil tank yards. Most notably, Fuchida gave a firsthand account of this meeting several times after the war. However, some historians have cast doubt on this and many other of Fuchida's later claims, which sometimes conflict with documented historic records. Genda, who opined during the planning for the attack that without an invasion three strikes were necessary to fully disable the Pacific Fleet, denied requesting an additional attack. Regardless, it is undisputed that the captains of the other five carriers in the task force reported they were willing and ready to carry out a third strike soon after the second returned, but Nagumo decided to withdraw for several reasons:
 American anti-aircraft performance had improved considerably during the second strike, and two-thirds of Japan's losses were incurred during the second wave.
 Nagumo felt if he launched a third strike, he would be risking three-quarters of the Combined Fleet's strength to wipe out the remaining targets (which included the facilities) while suffering higher aircraft losses.
 The location of the American carriers remained unknown. In addition, the admiral was concerned his force was now within range of American land-based bombers. Nagumo was uncertain whether the US had enough surviving planes remaining on Hawaii to launch an attack against his carriers.
 A third wave would have required substantial preparation and turnaround time, and would have meant returning planes would have had to land at night. At the time, only the Royal Navy had developed night carrier techniques, so this was a substantial risk. The first two waves had launched the entirety of the Combined Fleet's air strength. A third wave would have required landing both the first and second wave before launching the first wave again. Compare Nagumo's situation in the Battle of Midway where an attack returning from Midway kept Nagumo from launching an immediate strike on American carriers.
 The task force's fuel situation did not permit him to remain in waters north of Pearl Harbor much longer since he was at the very limit of logistical support. To do so risked running unacceptably low on fuel, perhaps even having to abandon destroyers en route home.
 He believed the second strike had essentially accomplished the mission's main objective (neutralizing the US Pacific Fleet) and did not wish to risk further losses. Moreover, it was IJN practice to prefer the conservation of strength over the total destruction of the enemy.

Although a hypothetical third strike would have likely focused on the base's remaining warships, military historians have suggested any potential damage to the shore facilities would have hampered the US Pacific Fleet far more seriously. If they had been wiped out, "serious [American] operations in the Pacific would have been postponed for more than a year"; according to Admiral Chester W. Nimitz, later Commander in Chief of the Pacific Fleet, "it would have prolonged the war another two years".

At a conference aboard his flagship the following morning, Yamamoto supported Nagumo's withdrawal without launching a third wave. In retrospect, sparing the vital dockyards, maintenance shops, and the oil tank farm meant the US could respond relatively quickly to Japanese activities in the Pacific. Yamamoto later regretted Nagumo's decision to withdraw and categorically stated it had been a great mistake not to order a third strike.

Ships lost or damaged

Twenty-one American ships were damaged or lost in the attack, of which all but three were repaired and returned to service.

Battleships
  (Rear Admiral Isaac C. Kidd's flagship of Battleship Division One): hit by four armor-piercing bombs, exploded; total loss, not salvaged. 1,177 dead.
 : hit by five torpedoes, capsized; total loss, salvaged and scrapped. 429 dead.
 : hit by two bombs, seven torpedoes, sunk; returned to service July 1944. 106 dead.
 : hit by two bombs, two torpedoes, sunk; returned to service January 1944. 100 dead.
 : hit by six bombs, one torpedo, beached; returned to service October 1942. 60 dead.
  (Admiral Husband E. Kimmel's flagship of the United States Pacific Fleet): in dry dock with Cassin and Downes, hit by one bomb and debris from USS Cassin; remained in service. 9 dead.
 : hit by two bombs; returned to service February 1942. 5 dead.
 : hit by two bombs; returned to service February 1942. 4 dead (including floatplane pilot shot down).

Ex-battleship (target/AA training ship)
 : hit by two torpedoes, capsized; total loss, salvage stopped. 64 dead.

Cruisers
 : hit by one torpedo; returned to service January 1942. 20 dead.
 : hit by one torpedo; returned to service February 1942.
 : near miss, light damage; remained in service.

Destroyers
 : in drydock with Downes and Pennsylvania, hit by one bomb, burned; reconstructed and returned to service February 1944.
 : in drydock with Cassin and Pennsylvania, caught fire from Cassin, burned; reconstructed and returned to service November 1943.
 : underway to West Loch, damaged by two near-miss bombs; continued patrol; dry-docked January 15, 1942, and sailed January 20, 1942.
 : hit by three bombs; returned to service June 1942.

Auxiliaries
  (minelayer): damaged by torpedo hit on Helena, capsized; returned to service (as engine-repair ship) February 1944.
  (repair ship): hit by two bombs, blast and fire from Arizona, beached; returned to service by August 1942.
  (seaplane tender): hit by one bomb, one crashed Japanese aircraft; returned to service January 1942. 19 dead.
  (harbor tug): damaged by explosion and fires in Shaw; sunk; returned to service August 1942.
  (yard floating dock): damaged by bombs; sunk; returned to service January 25, 1942, servicing Shaw.

Salvage
After a systematic search for survivors, Captain Homer N. Wallin was ordered to lead a formal salvage operation.

Around Pearl Harbor, divers from the Navy (shore and tenders), the Pearl Harbor Naval Shipyard, and civilian contractors (Pacific Bridge Company and others) began work on the ships that could be refloated. They patched holes, cleared debris, and pumped water out of ships. Navy divers worked inside the damaged ships. Within six months, five battleships and two cruisers were patched or refloated so they could be sent to shipyards in Pearl Harbor and on the mainland for extensive repair.

Intensive salvage operations continued for another year, a total of some 20,000 man-hours under water. Arizona and the target ship Utah were too heavily damaged for salvage and remain where they were sunk, with Arizona becoming a war memorial. Oklahoma, while successfully raised, was never repaired and capsized while under tow to the mainland in 1947. The Nevada proved particularly difficult to raise and repair; two men involved in the operation died after inhaling poisonous gases that had accumulated in the ship's interior. When feasible, armament and equipment were removed from vessels too damaged to repair and put to use aboard other craft.

News coverage
The initial announcement of the attack on Pearl Harbor was made by the White House Press Secretary, Stephen Early, at 2:22p.m. Eastern time (8:52a.m. Hawaiian time): "The Japanese have attacked Pearl Harbor from the air and all naval and military activities on the island of Oahu, principal American base in the Hawaiian islands." As information developed, Early made a number of additional announcements to approximately 150 White House reporters over the course of the afternoon.

Initial reports of the attack moved on news wires at approximately 2:25p.m. Eastern time. The first radio coverage (which, at the time, represented the earliest opportunity for ordinary people to learn of the attack) was on the CBS radio network's scheduled news program, World News Today, at 2:30p.m. Eastern time. John Charles Daly read the initial report, then switched to London, where Robert Trout ad-libbed on the possible London reaction. The first report on NBC cut into a play, a dramatization of The Inspector-General, at 2:33p.m. Eastern time and lasted only 21 seconds. Unlike the later practice with major news stories, there were only brief interruptions of scheduled commercial programming.

A contemporaneous newspaper report compared the attack to the Battle of Port Arthur in which the Imperial Japanese Navy attacked the Imperial Russian Navy, triggering the Russo-Japanese War, 37 years prior. Modern writers have continued to note parallels between the attacks, albeit more dispassionately.

Aftermath

The day after the attack, Roosevelt delivered his famous Day of Infamy speech to a Joint Session of Congress, calling for a formal declaration of war on the Empire of Japan. Congress obliged his request less than an hour later. On December 11, Germany and Italy declared war on the United States, even though the Tripartite Pact did not require it. Congress issued a declaration of war against Germany and Italy later that same day.

The United Kingdom had already been at war with Germany since September 1939 and with Italy since June 1940, and British Prime Minister Winston Churchill had promised to declare war "within the hour" of a Japanese attack on the United States. Upon learning of the Japanese attacks on Malaya, Singapore, and Hong Kong, Churchill promptly determined there was no need to either wait or further consult the US government and immediately summoned the Japanese Ambassador. As a result, the UK declared war on Japan nine hours before the US did.

The attack was an initial shock to all the Allies in the Pacific Theater. Further losses compounded the alarming setback. Japan attacked the Philippines hours later (because of the time difference, it was December 8 in the Philippines). Only three days after the attack on Pearl Harbor, the battleships Prince of Wales and Repulse were sunk off the coast of Malaya, causing Churchill later to recollect "In all the war I never received a more direct shock. As I turned and twisted in bed the full horror of the news sank in upon me. There were no British or American capital ships in the Indian Ocean or the Pacific except the American survivors of Pearl Harbor who were hastening back to California. Over this vast expanse of waters, Japan was supreme and we everywhere were weak and naked."

Throughout the war, Pearl Harbor was frequently used in American propaganda.

One further consequence of the attack on Pearl Harbor and its aftermath (notably the Niihau incident) was that Japanese-American residents and citizens were relocated to nearby Japanese-American internment camps. Within hours of the attack, hundreds of Japanese-American leaders were rounded up and taken to high-security camps such as Sand Island at the mouth of Honolulu harbor and Kilauea Military Camp on the island of Hawaii. Eventually, more than 110,000 Japanese Americans, nearly all who lived on the West Coast, were forced into interior camps, but in Hawaii, where the 150,000-plus Japanese Americans composed over one-third of the population, only 1,200 to 1,800 were interned.

The attack also had international consequences. The Canadian province of British Columbia, bordering the Pacific Ocean, had long had a large population of Japanese immigrants and their Japanese Canadian descendants. Pre-war tensions were exacerbated by the Pearl Harbor attack, leading to a reaction from the Government of Canada. On February 24, 1942, Order-in-Council P.C. no. 1486 was passed under the War Measures Act, allowing for the forced removal of any and all Canadians of Japanese descent from British Columbia, as well as prohibiting them from returning to the province. On March 4, regulations under the Act were adopted to evacuate Japanese-Canadians. As a result, 12,000 were interned in interior camps, 2,000 were sent to road camps, and another 2,000 were forced to work in the prairies on sugar beet farms.

In the wake of the attack, 15 Medals of Honor, 51 Navy Crosses, 53 Silver Stars, four Navy and Marine Corps Medals, one Distinguished Flying Cross, four Distinguished Service Crosses, one Distinguished Service Medal, and three Bronze Star Medals were awarded to the American servicemen who distinguished themselves in combat at Pearl Harbor. Additionally, a special military award, the Pearl Harbor Commemorative Medal, was later authorized for all military veterans of the attack.

Niihau Incident

Japanese planners of the Pearl Harbor attack had determined that some means were required for rescuing fliers whose aircraft were damaged too badly to return to the carriers. The island of Niihau, only thirty minutes by air from Pearl Harbor, was designated as the rescue point.

During the second wave, one Zero fighter flown by Petty Officer Shigenori Nishikaichi of the Hiryu was damaged in the attack on Wheeler, so he flew to the rescue point. The aircraft was further damaged on the crash landing. Nishikaichi was helped from the wreckage by one of the Native Hawaiians, who, aware of the tension between the United States and Japan, took the pilot's pistol, maps, codes, and other documents. The island's residents had no telephones or radios and were completely unaware of the attack on Pearl Harbor. Nishikaichi enlisted the support of three Japanese American residents in an attempt to recover the documents. During the ensuing struggles, Nishikaichi was killed, and a Hawaiian civilian was wounded; one collaborator committed suicide, and his wife and the third collaborator were sent to prison.

The ease with which the local ethnic Japanese residents had apparently gone to Nishikaichi's assistance was a source of concern for many and tended to support those who believed that local Japanese could not be trusted.

Strategic implications
Admiral Hara Tadaichi summed up the Japanese result by saying, "We won a great tactical victory at Pearl Harbor and thereby lost the war."

While the attack accomplished its intended objective, it turned out to be largely unnecessary. Unbeknownst to Yamamoto, who conceived the original plan, the U.S. Navy had decided as far back as 1935 to abandon 'charging' across the Pacific towards the Philippines in response to an outbreak of war (in keeping with the evolution of Plan Orange). The U.S. instead adopted "Plan Dog" in 1940, which emphasized keeping the IJN out of the eastern Pacific and away from the shipping lanes to Australia, while the U.S. concentrated on defeating Nazi Germany.

Fortunately for the United States, the American aircraft carriers were untouched; otherwise the Pacific Fleet's ability to conduct offensive operations would have been crippled for a year or more (given no diversions from the Atlantic Fleet). As it was, the U.S. Navy was left with no choice but to rely on carriers and submarines, the very weapons with which the US Navy halted and eventually reversed the Japanese advance. While six of the eight battleships were repaired and returned to service, their relatively low speed and high fuel consumption limited their deployment, and they served mainly in shore bombardment roles (their only major action being the Battle of Surigao Strait in October 1944). A major flaw of Japanese strategic thinking was a belief that the ultimate Pacific battle would be fought by battleships, in keeping with the doctrine of Captain Alfred Thayer Mahan. As a result, Yamamoto (and his successors) hoarded battleships for a "decisive battle" that never happened.

The Japanese confidence in their ability to win a quick victory meant that they neglected Pearl Harbor's navy repair yards, oil tank farms, submarine base, and old headquarters building. All of these targets were omitted from Genda's list, yet they proved more important than any battleship to the American war effort in the Pacific. The survival of the repair shops and fuel depots allowed Pearl Harbor to maintain logistical support to the US Navy's operations, such as the Doolittle Raid and the Battles of the Coral Sea and Midway. It was submarines that immobilized the Imperial Japanese Navy's heavy ships and brought Japan's economy to a virtual standstill by crippling the importation of oil and raw materials: by the end of 1942, the amount of raw materials brought in was cut in half, "to a disastrous ten million tons", while oil "was almost completely stopped". Lastly, the basement of the Old Administration Building was the home of the cryptanalytic unit which contributed significantly to the Midway ambush and the Submarine Force's success.

Retrospective debate on American intelligence

Ever since the Japanese attack, there has been debate as to how and why the United States had been caught unaware, and how much and when American officials knew of Japanese plans and related topics. As early as 1924, Chief of U.S. Air Service Mason Patrick displayed a concern for military vulnerabilities in the Pacific, having sent General Billy Mitchell on a survey of the Pacific and the East. Patrick called Mitchell's subsequent report, which identified vulnerabilities in Hawaii, a "theoretical treatise on employment of airpower in the Pacific, which, in all probability undoubtedly will be of extreme value some 10 or 15 years hence".

At least two naval war games, one in 1932 and another in 1936, proved that Pearl was vulnerable to such an attack. Admiral James Richardson was removed from command shortly after protesting President Roosevelt's decision to move the bulk of the Pacific fleet to Pearl Harbor. The decisions of military and political leadership to ignore these warnings have contributed to conspiracy theories. Several writers, including decorated World WarII veteran and journalist Robert Stinnett, author of Day of Deceit, and former United States Rear Admiral Robert Alfred Theobald, author of The Final Secret of Pearl Harbor: The Washington Background of the Pearl Harbor Attack, have argued that various parties high in the US and British governments knew of the attack in advance and may even have let it happen or encouraged it in order to force the US into war via the so-called "back door". However, this conspiracy theory is rejected by mainstream historians.

In popular culture

See also

 Air warfare of World War II
 Bombing of Dublin in World War II 
 Bombings of Switzerland in World War II
 Casus Belli
 Japanese Attack on Howland Island
 List of attacks on U.S. territory
 List of Medal of Honor recipients for the Attack on Pearl Harbor
 List of United States Navy ships present at Pearl Harbor, December 7, 1941
 Nagao Kita
 National Pearl Harbor Remembrance Day
 Operation K
 Pacific Theater aircraft carrier operations during World War II
 Pearl Harbor National Memorial
 Pearl Harbor Survivors Association
 Winds Code

References

Notes

Citations

Bibliography

Books

US government documents

Journal articles

Magazine articles

Online sources

Further reading

 
 . An account of the secret "Clausen Inquiry" undertaken late in the war by order of Congress to Secretary of War Henry L. Stimson. Clausen was given the authority to go anywhere and question anyone under oath. Ultimately, he traveled more than 55,000 miles and interviewed over a hundred US and British Army, Navy, and civilian personnel, in addition to being given access to all relevant Magic intercepts.
 . This article discusses the state of medical readiness prior to the attack, and the post-attack response by medical personnel.
 . A study of Japanese wartime media representations of the submarine component of the attack on Pearl Harbor.
 
 . A recent examination of the issues surrounding the surprise of the attack.
 
 . Part of a twelve-volume series.
 . Contains some important material, such as Holmes's argument that, had the US Navy been warned of the attack and put to sea, it would have likely resulted in an even greater disaster.
 . Contains a brief but insightful chapter on the particular intelligence failures, and a broader overview of what causes them.
 . Using maps, photos, unique illustrations, and an animated CD, this book provides a detailed overview of the surprise attack that brought the United States into World WarII.
 . Contains a passage regarding the Yarnell attack, as well as reference citations.
 . Layton, Kimmel's Combat Intelligence Officer, says that Douglas MacArthur was the only field commander who had received any substantial amount of Purple intelligence.
 
 . The McCollum memo is a 1940 memo from a Naval headquarters staff officer to his superiors outlining possible provocations to Japan, which might lead to war (declassified in 1994).
 .
 . An overview of different surgical procedures at the hospital at the scene of the event.
 . Conspiracy theory.
 . Contains a detailed description of what the Navy knew from intercepted and decrypted Japan's communications prior to Pearl.
 
 .
 
 . A study of the Freedom of Information Act documents that led Congress to direct clearance of Kimmel and Short.
 
 . Foreword by Fleet Admiral William F. Halsey, Jr.
 
 
 . The most cited scholarly work on the intelligence failure at Pearl Harbor. Her introduction and analysis of the concept of "noise" persist in understanding intelligence failures.

External links

 Navy History Heritage Command Official Overview
 History.com Account With Video
 About Education Account
 "Remembering Pearl Harbor:The USS Arizona Memorial", a National Park Service Teaching with Historic Places (TwHP) lesson plan
 Hawaii War Records Depository, Archives & Manuscripts Department, University of Hawaii at Manoa Library
 7 December 1941, The Air Force Story
 The "Magic" Background (PDFs or readable online)
 The Congressional investigation

Accounts
 Guarding The United States And Its Outposts, in Guarding the United States and Its Outposts  Official US Army history of Pearl Harbor by the United States Army Center of Military History
 War comes to Hawaii Honolulu Star-Bulletin, Monday, September 13, 1999

Media
 Video of first Newsreel from December 23, 1941 attack on Pearl Harbor
 Pearl Harbour – British Movietone News, 1942
 Historic footage of Pearl Harbor during and immediately following attack on December 7, 1941

Historical documents
 WW2DB: US Navy Report of Japanese Raid on Pearl Harbor
 Second World War – USA Declaration of War on Japan
 Collection of extensive Japanese preparation military documents

Attack on Pearl Harbor
1941 in Hawaii
1941 in the United States
Conflicts in 1941
December 1941 events
Explosions in 1941
Pearl Harbor
Airstrikes conducted by Japan
World War II aerial operations and battles of the Pacific theatre
Attacks on military installations in the 1940s